In enzymology, a vanillin synthase is an enzyme that catalyzes the chemical reaction

3-hydroxy-3-(4-hydroxy-3-methoxyphenyl)propanoyl-CoA  vanillin + acetyl-CoA

Hence, this enzyme has one substrate, 3-hydroxy-3-(4-hydroxy-3-methoxyphenyl)propanoyl-CoA, and two products, vanillin and acetyl-CoA.

This enzyme belongs to the family of lyases, specifically the aldehyde-lyases, which cleave carbon-carbon bonds.  The systematic name of this enzyme class is 3-hydroxy-3-(4-hydroxy-3-methoxyphenyl)propanoyl-CoA vanillin-lyase (acetyl-CoA-forming). Other names in common use include 3-hydroxy-3-(4-hydroxy-3-methoxyphenyl)propionyl-CoA:vanillin lyase, and (acetyl-CoA-forming).

References 

 
 

EC 4.1.2
Enzymes of unknown structure